The Millennium Building is a building located in downtown Missoula, Montana, United States. At 9 floors, it is the tallest building in downtown Missoula and rises to 128 feet.

History 
The Millennium Building was opened in 1998.

Tenants 
One of the Millennium Building's main tenants is Dorsey & Whitney, who occupies the 6th floor of the building.  Dorsey & Whitney is a national law firm based out of Minneapolis which maintains a small but successful satellite office in Montana.

Grundig Satellit 800, a live radio station, is also located in the Millennium Building.

References 

Buildings and structures in Missoula, Montana
Office buildings in Montana
Office buildings completed in 1998